Arm warmers are knitted "sleeves" worn on the arms. Sometimes worn by dancers to warm up their bodies before class, they have also become somewhat of a fashion item, appearing in the fall.

Arm warmers can also describe any glove-like articles of clothing that lack finger coverings and/or were originally designed to keep wrists and lower arms warm. Today, many competition and sport bicyclists as well as distance runners/marathoners wear spandex-compression arm-warmers.

History
Various sub-cultures, such as the punk, emo and goth subcultures, have also adopted arm warmers as a fashion statement. Stores such as Hot Topic sell arm warmers with chains and designs of skulls, piano keys, band logos, and other alternative inspired designs.

Sports

Sleeves made from Spandex or Lycra are used by long-distance runners and other endurance athletes. The compressive effect prevents swelling of the arm muscles and the build-up of lactic acid; they also provide insulation in cold weather and solar ultraviolet protection. During 2010 FIFA World Cup, arm warmers featuring the participating national teams became a phenomenon in the host country South Africa and abroad.

See also

Evening glove
Gloves
Leg warmer
Engageante

References

Sportswear
Dancewear
Armwear
Gloves
2000s fashion
2010s fashion

fr:Gant#Moufle ou mitaine